Stories to Tell is the fourth solo studio album by Brazilian jazz singer Flora Purim that was released in 1974 on Milestone Records.

Reception
AllMusic awarded the album with 4 stars and its review by Jim Newsom states: "Assisted by a cast of jazz/fusion all-stars led by husband Airto Moreira, Purim shows off the wide range of her abilities: from wordless vocal soaring to songs with lyrics in English and Portuguese, from up tempo percussion-driven workouts to beautiful ballads".

Track listing

Personnel 
 Flora Purim – vocals
 George Duke – keyboards, ARP synthesizer
 Earl Klugh – guitar
 Airto Moreira – drums, percussion
 King Errisson – conga drums
 Carlos Santana – guitar (track: 7)
 Miroslav Vitouš – bass and Moog synthesizer (track: 1), ARP synthesizer (track: 7)
 Ron Carter – bass (tracks: 2, 3 and 8)
 Raul de Souza – trombone solo (tracks: 3, 6 and 8)
 Oscar Brashear – flugelhorn (tracks: 3 and 8)
 George Bohanon – trombone (tracks: 3 and 8)
 Hadley Caliman – flute, alto flute (tracks: 3 and 8)
 Oscar Castro-Neves – acoustic guitar (tracks: 4, 5, 6 and 8)
 Ernie Hood – zithers, vocals (track: 5)
 Larry Dunlap – piano (track: 5)

References 

1974 albums
Flora Purim albums
Milestone Records albums
Albums produced by Orrin Keepnews